Cedric is a ghost town in northeastern Chambers County, Alabama. Today it is entirely in private ownership.  It is located 3–4 miles to the southeast of present-day Roanoke, and about 1 mile southwest of Bacon Level Church. Joseph Rushton (and his wife Martha Lorance) an early Alabama potter, lived near Cedric.

Pottery industry
While nearby Bacon Level had several well known potters, Cedric's Joseph Rushton was part of their community as well.

References

Geography of Chambers County, Alabama
Ghost towns in Alabama
Ghost towns in the United States
Ghost towns in North America